Dale Morris (born 29 December 1982) is a former Australian rules footballer who played for the Western Bulldogs in the Australian Football League (AFL).

Morris spent four years playing for Werribee Football Club in the Victorian Football League before being added to the Bulldogs' rookie list in the 2004 Rookie Draft. He quickly cemented his place in the Western Bulldogs' lineup, impressing many with his pace and consistency as a defender, and finished with 17 games for season 2005. He was elevated to the senior list at the end of 2005.

Morris was selected in the back pocket of the 2008 All-Australian team.

Morris played in guernsey number 38 for the duration of his career.

In Round 21, 2011, against the Essendon Bombers, Morris suffered a broken tibia in his lower right leg which prematurely ended his season. Morris returned to play one quarter in a Development Match game in Round 6, 2012, but suffered a stress fracture in the same leg which he broke in horrific circumstances in 2011. The injury sidelined Morris for the rest of the season.

Morris made his return to AFL in Round 1, 2013. In what was overall a successful campaign for Morris, he provided defensive solidity to the Bulldog's back line, and also managed to play all 22 games for the season.

In 2016, Morris was a part of the Western Bulldogs premiership team that ended their long-standing premiership drought of 62 years. With over five minutes to go in the match, Morris laid a game-turning tackle on Sydney Swans forward Lance Franklin, which set up Tom Boyd to kick a goal that gave the Bulldogs a 15-point lead. After the game, it was revealed that Morris had played the entire finals series with a fractured vertebrae.

Morris is known for his quick recovery from injury. He suffered a partial tear in his ACL in 2018 yet came back to play the back-end of the 2018 season. In 2019, he suffered another ACL, and was out of action until Round 19, where he rupture his ACL for the third time in 18 months. Prior to the 2019 final series, Morris announced his retirement after 253 games.

Statistics

|-  
! scope="row" style="text-align:center" | 2005
|
| 38 || 17 || 0 || 1 || 56 || 107 || 163 || 48 || 43 || 0.0 || 0.1 || 3.3 || 6.3 || 9.6 || 2.8 || 2.5
|-
! scope="row" style="text-align:center" | 2006
|
| 38 || 24 || 1 || 3 || 127 || 170 || 297 || 104 || 56 || 0.0 || 0.1 || 5.3 || 7.1 || 12.4 || 4.3 || 2.3
|- 
! scope="row" style="text-align:center" | 2007
|
| 38 || 21 || 0 || 1 || 135 || 126 || 261 || 101 || 56 || 0.0 || 0.0 || 6.4 || 6.0 || 12.4 || 4.8 || 2.7
|-
! scope="row" style="text-align:center" | 2008
|
| 38 || 25 || 0 || 0 || 156 || 170 || 326 || 120 || 73 || 0.0 || 0.0 || 6.2 || 6.8 || 13.0 || 4.8 || 2.9
|-  
! scope="row" style="text-align:center" | 2009
|
| 38 || 25 || 1 || 2 || 115 || 187 || 302 || 123 || 59 || 0.0 || 0.1 || 4.6 || 7.5 || 12.1 || 4.9 || 2.4
|-
! scope="row" style="text-align:center" | 2010
|
| 38 || 21 || 0 || 1 || 111 || 141 || 252 || 73 || 62 || 0.0 || 0.0 || 5.3 || 6.7 || 12.0 || 3.5 || 3.0
|-  
! scope="row" style="text-align:center" | 2011
|
| 38 || 18 || 1 || 0 || 127 || 100 || 227 || 80 || 70 || 0.1 || 0.0 || 7.1 || 5.6 || 12.6 || 4.4 || 3.9
|-
! scope="row" style="text-align:center" | 2012
|
| 38 || 0 || — || — || — || — || — || — || — || — || — || — || — || — || — || —
|-  
! scope="row" style="text-align:center" | 2013
|
| 38 || 22 || 0 || 0 || 122 || 133 || 255 || 83 || 51 || 0.0 || 0.0 || 5.5 || 6.0 || 11.6 || 3.8 || 2.3
|-
! scope="row" style="text-align:center" | 2014
|
| 38 || 20 || 0 || 0 || 119 || 108 || 227 || 82 || 47 || 0.0 || 0.0 || 6.0 || 5.4 || 11.4 || 4.1 || 2.4
|- 
! scope="row" style="text-align:center" | 2015
|
| 38 || 14 || 0 || 0 || 70 || 85 || 155 || 69 || 35 || 0.0 || 0.0 || 5.0 || 6.1 || 11.1 || 4.9 || 2.5
|-
| scope=row bgcolor=F0E68C | 2016# 
|
| 38 || 23 || 0 || 2 || 129 || 178 || 307 || 104 || 54 || 0.0 || 0.1 || 5.6 || 7.7 || 13.3 || 4.5 || 2.3
|-  
! scope="row" style="text-align:center" | 2017
|
| 38 || 11 || 0 || 0 || 38 || 74 || 112 || 34 || 24 || 0.0 || 0.0 || 3.4 || 6.7 || 10.2 || 3.1 || 2.2
|-
! scope="row" style="text-align:center" | 2018
|
| 38 || 11 || 0 || 1 || 49 || 70 || 119 || 39 || 23 || 0.0 || 0.1 || 4.5 || 6.4 || 10.8 || 3.5 || 2.1
|-  
! scope="row" style="text-align:center" | 2019
|
| 38 || 1 || 0 || 0 || 3 || 3 || 6 || 2 || 0 || 0.0 || 0.0 || 3.0 || 3.0 || 6.0 || 2.0 || 0.0
|- class="sortbottom"
! colspan=3| Career
! 253
! 3
! 11
! 1357
! 1652
! 3009
! 1062
! 653
! 0.0
! 0.0
! 5.4
! 6.5
! 11.9
! 4.2
! 2.6
|}

Honours and achievements
Team
AFL premiership: 2016
Pre-season premiership player: 2010
Individual
Doug Hawkins Medal: 2016
John Van Groningen Domestique Award: 2016
All-Australian: 2008

References

External links

Western Bulldogs players
Western Bulldogs Premiership players
1982 births
Living people
Australian rules footballers from Victoria (Australia)
All-Australians (AFL)
Doutta Stars Football Club players
Werribee Football Club players
Australia international rules football team players
One-time VFL/AFL Premiership players